The Real Live Tour was a concert tour by the heavy metal band Iron Maiden from 25 March 1993 to 28 August 1993.

Background
It was the last tour which featured lead vocalist Bruce Dickinson before his return to the band in 1999, leaving to pursue a solo career, his final shows taking place at Pinewood Studios and filmed for the live video, Raising Hell.

As he had already announced his plans to leave before the tour began, Dickinson states that the concerts were extremely challenging, explaining that "we walked out onstage and it was like a morgue. The Maiden fans knew I'd quit, they knew these were the last gigs, and I suddenly realised that, as the frontman, you're in an almost impossible situation. If you're like, 'Wow, this is really fucking cool tonight, man,' they're all gonna sit there going, 'What a wanker. He's leaving. How can it be cool?' Or do you go on and say, 'Look, I'm really sorry I'm leaving – not to put a damper on the evening, but I am quitting'? I mean, what do you do?" Bassist Steve Harris claims that, during the less high-profile shows, Dickinson would deliberately underperform, sometimes just mumbling into the microphone, although Dickinson has since denied the allegations. On 1 May 1993 the band performed at Primo Maggio Free Festival in Rome, Piazza San Giovanni. According to different sources, the crowd was estimated at 500,000 to one million people in attendance. Iron Maiden toured an extensive Italian leg and visited Russia for the very first time, playing three consecutive nights at Moscow's Olympic Stadium.

Setlist 
 "Be Quick or Be Dead" (from Fear of the Dark, 1992)
 "The Number of the Beast" (from The Number of the Beast, 1982)
 "Prowler" (from Iron Maiden, 1980)
 "Transylvania" (from Iron Maiden, 1980)
 "Remember Tomorrow" (from Iron Maiden, 1980)
 "Where Eagles Dare" (from Piece of Mind, 1983) (Dropped after 17 April 1993)
 "From Here to Eternity" (from Fear of the Dark, 1992)
 "Wasting Love" (from Fear of the Dark, 1992)
 "Bring Your Daughter... to the Slaughter" (from No Prayer for the Dying, 1990)
 "Wasted Years" (from Somewhere In Time, 1986)
 "The Evil That Men Do" (from Seventh Son of a Seventh Son, 1988)
 "Afraid to Shoot Strangers" (from Fear of the Dark, 1992)
 "Fear of the Dark" (from Fear of the Dark, 1992)
 "The Clairvoyant" (from Seventh Son of a Seventh Son, 1988)
 "Heaven Can Wait" (from Somewhere in Time, 1986)
 "Run to the Hills" (from The Number of the Beast, 1982)
 "2 Minutes to Midnight" (from Powerslave, 1984)
 "Iron Maiden" (from Iron Maiden, 1980)
 "Hallowed Be Thy Name" (from The Number of the Beast, 1982)
 "The Trooper" (from Piece of Mind, 1983)
 "Sanctuary" (from Iron Maiden, 1980)

 "Running Free" (from Iron Maiden, 1980) & "Wrathchild" (from Killers, 1981) were also played at a few venues.

Tour dates

Reference:

Cancelled and rescheduled dates
 30 March 1993: Berlin, Germany, Huxley's Neue Welt (rescheduled to 11 April.)
 2 April 1993: Moscow, Russia, Olympic Hall (rescheduled to 2 June.)
 3 April 1993: Moscow, Russia, Olympic Hall (rescheduled to 3 June.)
 4 April 1993: Moscow, Russia, Olympic Hall (rescheduled to 4 June.)
 3 May 1993: Reggio de Calabria, Italy, Palasport (due to insufficient security.)

References

External links
 Official website
 Real Live Tour dates

Iron Maiden concert tours
1993 concert tours